Night Passage is the ninth studio album by Weather Report, released in 1980. The tracks were recorded on July 12 and 13, 1980 at The Complex studios in Los Angeles (before a crowd of 250 people who can be heard on a couple of tracks), except for "Madagascar", recorded live at the Festival Hall, Osaka, Japan on June 29 of the same year. 

The album introduces a new member to the band, namely percussionist Robert Thomas Jr. Night Passage dials back the elaborate production of some of Weather Report's earlier releases (most notably 1978's Mr. Gone). What is lost in overdubs is made up in solo improvisation in the classic jazz tradition.

Trivia 

The 7th track on the album "Three Views of a Secret" would be re-recorded for Jaco Pastorius' second solo studio album entitled Word of Mouth (1981).

Critical reception 

Richard S. Ginell of Allmusic gave a four out of five stars review saying "All things being relative, this is Weather Report's straight-ahead album, where the elaborate production layers of the late-'70s gave way to sparer textures and more unadorned solo improvisation in the jazz tradition, electric instruments and all." Don Heckman of High Fidelity called Night Passage "one of the finest albums Weather Report has ever made".

Night Passage was Grammy-nominated in the category of Best Jazz Fusion Performance, Vocal or Instrumental. However, the album did not win the award in this category.

Track listing

Personnel 
Weather Report
 Josef Zawinul – keyboards and synthesizers
 Wayne Shorter – saxophones
 Jaco Pastorius – fretless bass
 Peter Erskine – drums
 Robert Thomas Jr. – percussion

Production
 Brian Risner – engineer
 George Massenburg – engineer
 Jerry Hudgins – engineer
 Joseph Futterer – art direction
 Richie Powell – art direction
 Nicholas DeVore III – cover photography
 Pete Turner – cover photography

References

External links 
 Weather Report Annotated Discography: Night Passage (1980)
 Weather Report - Night Passage (1980) album releases & credits at Discogs
 Weather Report - Night Passage (1980) album to be listened on Spotify
 Weather Report - Night Passage (1980) album to be listened on YouTube

Weather Report albums
1980 albums
Columbia Records albums
ARC Records albums